Gargunnock railway station served the village of Gargunnock, Stirling, Scotland, from 1856 to 1959 on the Forth and Clyde Junction Railway.

History 
The station was opened on 26 May 1856 by the Forth and Clyde Junction Railway. To the west was the goods yard and to the west of the level crossing was the signal box, which opened in 1892. On the north side of the line were sidings which served a sawmill. The station initially had only one platform but another was later added. It closed on 1 October 1934 and the signal box was downgraded to a ground frame shortly after. It closed to goods on 5 October 1959.

References 

Disused railway stations in Stirlingshire
Railway stations in Great Britain opened in 1856
Railway stations in Great Britain closed in 1934
1856 establishments in Scotland
1934 disestablishments in Scotland